Deep Dead Blue is a live album by Elvis Costello with Bill Frisell recorded at the Meltdown Festival in 1995.

Review
The Allmusic review by Steve Huey states "It's no real surprise that the two work well together, given the musical affinity demonstrated on Frisell's masterful reinterpretations of Painted from Memory material on his own album The Sweetest Punch. The pleasures of Deep Dead Blue are, to be sure, much subtler than either of those recordings, but they make an elegant and fascinating supplement".

Track listing
 "Weird Nightmare" (Charles Mingus) – 3:35
 "Love Field" (Elvis Costello) – 3:24
 "Shamed into Love" (Rubén Blades, Costello) – 4:26
 "Gigi" (Alan Jay Lerner, Frederick Loewe) – 4:16
 "Poor Napoleon" (Declan MacManus) – 4:05
 "Baby Plays Around" (Cait O'Riordan, MacManus) – 3:08
 "Deep Dead Blue" (Costello, Bill Frisell) – 3:51

Personnel
Elvis Costello -voice
Bill Frisell - guitar
Technical
Roger Moutenot - engineer, mixing
Lee Townsend - mixing

References

Collaborative albums
Elvis Costello live albums
Bill Frisell albums
Live EPs
1995 EPs
1995 live albums
Nonesuch Records live albums
Nonesuch Records EPs